Treherniella is a genus of thrips in the family Phlaeothripidae.

Species
 Treherniella afra
 Treherniella amplipennis
 Treherniella atrata
 Treherniella daedalus
 †Treherniella fossilis
 Treherniella inferna

References

Phlaeothripidae
Thrips
Thrips genera